Saccular acoustic sensitivity  is a measurement of the ear's affectability to sound. The saccule's normal function is to keep the body balanced, but it is believed to have some hearing function for special frequencies and tones. Saccular acoustic sensitivity is considered to be simply an extension of the sense of hearing through the use of the saccule.

Effects 
Saccular acoustic sensitivity has a variety of physiological as well as mental/emotional effects.

Physical effects 
Perhaps the most observable physical response is goose bumps. A similar effect is the manifestation of chills. Some sounds have been known to cause reflexive muscle movements like a twitch or even a jump. Since these physical effects are easily recorded and are linked consistently with strong emotion, they have been used in several types of psychological studies.

Mental/Emotional effects 
Certain sounds, such as fingernails drawn down a blackboard, cause strong feelings of aversion or even fear in most humans. A 2004 study claimed that the blackboard sound was very similar to the warning cry of Siamang gibbons and hypothesized that a vestigial reflex is what causes the fight or flight reaction in humans. Other sounds, such as a person coughing or vomiting, provoke responses of disgust. These emotional reactions are thought to be caused by the body's natural tendency to avoid disease.

Stimulation

Negative Stimulation 
While each individual is extremely sensitive to different sounds, there are some nearly universal saccular acoustical stimulants. For example, the sound of fingernails scratching a blackboard will stimulate negative emotions along with chills in the majority of the population. Trevor J. Cox, of the University of Salford, was fascinated by this fact and conducted an online study to identify the "most horrible sound" in the world. Participants were asked to listen to recordings of various "bad" noises and rate them by their horribleness. "Vomiting" was selected as the most horrible sound by a wide margin. Surprisingly, "nails on a blackboard" was only ranked 16.

(* signifies a tie)

Positive Stimulation 
There are various sounds that correspond to positive physical and emotional reactions as well. Therapists use these soothing sounds for therapy in stress relief and relaxation. However, most of the sounds that invoke positive responses tend to be more subjective. Familiarity tends to play a large role in the amount of positive stimulation observed. For example, a man listening to a familiar song is more likely to experience pleasure and have goosebumps than a man listening to an unfamiliar song.

References 

Hearing